Rufus Carrollton Harris (c. 1898 – August 18, 1988) was the president of Tulane University from 1937 to 1959 and the 12th dean of the Tulane University Law School, from 1927 to 1937.

Education
He completed his undergraduate studies at Mercer University and earned two law degrees at Yale University, where he completed his Juris Doctor degree in 1924.

He left Tulane to become the President of Mercer University. He co-authored the GI Bill.

Role as Tulane University Law School dean
While at the Tulane Law School he established the Tulane Law Review.

References

1890s births
1988 deaths
Mercer University alumni
Yale University alumni
Tulane University faculty
Tulane University Law School faculty
Deans of Tulane University Law School
Presidents of Tulane University
People from Macon, Georgia
Deans of law schools in the United States
Gordon State College alumni
20th-century American academics